Euonymus obovatus, the running strawberry bush, is a trailing, woodland groundcover plant of the family Celastraceae, which is native to eastern North America in the eastern United States and southeastern Canada.

References

External links
University of Texas
Illinois wildflowers

obovatus
Flora of the Appalachian Mountains